Rhopalomenia aglaopheniae is a species of solenogasters, shell-less, worm-like, marine molluscs.

Distribution
This species is found in the North Atlantic Ocean.

References

Solenogastres
Molluscs described in 1887